Erkilet International Airport or Kayseri Erkilet Airport is a military airbase and public airport located  north of Kayseri in the Kayseri Province of Turkey. The airport is a major hub for travel to Cappadocia.

Facilities
The prior capacity of the airport was 600,000 passengers per year. With the opening of the new international terminal in March 2007, its total capacity increased up to one million passengers per year. The airport is able to accommodate jets the size of the Boeing 747. However, smaller jets like the Boeing 737 and Boeing 757 are more commonly seen there.

Airlines and destinations
The following airlines operate regular scheduled and charter flights at Erkilet Airport

Statistics

(*)Source: DHMI.gov.tr

Access
Public buses run from the airport (just outside the gates) to the city center and vice versa. Travelers can also hire a taxi or rent a car. A less expensive option is to pre-arrange your airport pick up either through a travel agency or your hotel.

References

External links

Airports in Turkey
Turkish Air Force bases
Buildings and structures in Kayseri Province
Transport in Kayseri Province